The 1996 ITC Mugello round was the tenth round of the 1996 International Touring Car Championship season. It took place on 29 September at the Mugello Circuit.

Nicola Larini won the first race, starting from pole position, driving an Alfa Romeo 155 V6 TI, and Bernd Schneider gained the second one, driving a Mercedes C-Class.

Classification

Qualifying

Race 1

Race 2

Standings after the event

Drivers' Championship standings

Manufacturers' Championship standings

 Note: Only the top five positions are included for both sets of drivers' standings.

References

External links
Deutsche Tourenwagen Masters official website

1996 International Touring Car Championship season